Lepidophyma cuicateca, the Sunidero tropical night lizard, is a species of lizard in the family Xantusiidae. It is a small lizard found in Santa María Texcatitlán, Oaxaca, Mexico at 1180 meters  elevation.

References

Lepidophyma
Endemic reptiles of Mexico
Fauna of the Sierra Madre del Sur
Reptiles described in 2008